Nowy Kawęczyn  is a village in Skierniewice County, Łódź Voivodeship, in central Poland. It is the seat of the gmina (administrative district) called Gmina Nowy Kawęczyn.

In 2004 the village had a population of 110.

References

Villages in Skierniewice County